The Copa Mesoamericana 2011 was a football tournament that was played from 28 to 30 December 2011. It was the first edition of the Copa Mesoamericana. played between teams of the south of Mexico and of Central America. It was hosted in Tapachula, Chiapas.

The tournament was won by Mexican club Chiapas, who defeated Salvadoran club Isidro Metapán 4–1 in the final.

Matches

Semifinals

Third Place

Final

References